Nordic Young Conservative Union (Nordisk Ungkonservativ Union; NUU) is an umbrella organization formed in 1946 in Gothenburg, with the increased political and economic cooperation between the Nordic countries and is currently the conservative group in Nordic Youth Council (HNR).

Members

References

External links 
 NUU på Norden.org

Organizations based in Gothenburg
1946 establishments in Sweden
Nordic organizations